Joseph Raffael (born February 22, 1933 in Brooklyn, NY - July 12, 2021 Cagnes-sur-Mer) was an American contemporary realist painter. His paintings, primarily watercolors, are almost all presented on a very large scale.

Early life 
Raffael was the youngest of three children and the only son of Sicilian and Swiss-Irish parents, Joseph Marino Raffaele and Cora Kaelin Raffaele.  He became interested in drawing at age 7, and spent his high school years taking classes at the nearby Brooklyn Museum. From 1951-54, he attended Cooper Union for the Advancement of Science and Art in New York City, along with fellow students R.B.Kitaj and Paul Thek. Upon graduation from Cooper Union, Raffael received a fellowship to the Yale Summer School of Art and Music in Norfolk, Connecticut.  Through the support of his instructor Bernard Chaet, Raffael was awarded a scholarship to the Yale School of Art, where he studied color and drawing with Josef Albers and received his BFA in 1956.  Instead of pursuing a master's degree, he moved to New York City to become a painter, where he worked freelance part-time at Jack Prince Textile Studio, alongside Carolyn Brady, Audrey Flack, and others, while working nights and weekends on his paintings.

Career 
In 1958, he won a Fulbright fellowship to study for two years in Florence and Rome, and began painting complexly colored watercolors of flower forms.  He mounted his first New York City exhibition of his Umbrian watercolors in 1963, at the d’Arcy Galleries, while at the same time battling hepatitis from which he almost died; when he recovered, he shifted to "real life" images based on photographs.

Raffael’s distinctively original art earned him critical praise from the mid 1960s on, while he was living in New York City and, later, in Marin County, California.  During this period, his circle of artist friends in New York City included the British photorealist Malcolm Morley, the painter Don Nice, the writer Linda Rosenkrantz, the photographer Peter Hujar and, in California, the artist William T. Wiley. In 1965, he had a solo exhibition at Eleanor Ward’s Stable Gallery. In 1966, he taught at University of California Davis.  He married his first wife, the artist Judy Davis, in 1968, and lived in Bennington, Vermont, commuting to New York City to teach at the School of Visual Arts. In 1969, the cour moved to the San Francisco Bay Area, where Raffael taught at UC Berkeley and later at California State University in Sacramento.  In 1972 he began his "water painting" series using photographs of rivers taken for him by painter friend William Allan. In 1973, Raffael quit teaching to paint full-time; he received first prize at the Tokyo International Biennale in 1974.

The death of his son Matthew and divorce in 1980 caused him to focus more on the spiritual, including imagery related to Buddhism. He began a relationship with his spiritual counselor, Lannis Wood, in 1984; they married in 1986 and moved to the south of France, where he resided, working in watercolors and acrylics. In 1988, Raffael began the Lannis in Sieste series, a group of paintings featuring over a dozen of his wife in repose.

Raffael's work was featured on the cover of the June 2007 issue of Watercolor Magic magazine, and on the covers of the May 2009, May 2014, and September 2017 issues of The Artist's Magazine. He became well known with a 1973 Time Magazine article by Robert Hughes A Slice of the River, showcasing his signature water paintings.  Hughes called Raffael “a very American figure recognizable from his 19th-century prototypes along the Hudson River and the Yosemite Valley; the painter as Italian altar boy in the cathedral of nature. These sumptuous works both dazzle and pull the viewer into the whirling vortex of the painting with a quiet force. Despite their iconic serenity when seen from a distance, Raffael’s paintings disclose a bejeweled profusion of incident close up.”  Hughes concluded by saying that the artist’s color-drenched canvases display “a tender virtuosity without parallel in other American figurative painting today.”

In 2016, for the first time in 20 years, Raffael moved away from his previous large-format work and began a new, ongoing series of small-format watercolor paintings.

In 2018, Raffael collaborated with David Pagel – professor, art critic, and contributor to the Los Angeles Times – to produce Talking Beauty: A Conversation Between Joseph Raffael and David Pagel about Art, Love, Death, and Creativity.  In his November 2018 review of the book in the San Francisco Review of Books, critic Grady Harp wrote, "...the joy of this book is slowly reading the interchange of ideas form the exchanged emails between these two men – comments on life, death, art and artists, writing, creativity, children, pets – all blended into a wondrous tapestry of the essence of being truly alive."

Personal life 
On May 19, 2019 his wife Lannis Wood Raffael died after a long period of health crises. Before her death, Raffael completed his painting "For Lannis: 1944-2019".

Raffael died at the age of 88 on 12 July 2021.

Awards
1975	 Purchase Prize, Concours d'Antiques, Oakland Museum, California
1974	 First Prize, Tokyo International Biennial, Japan
1960	 Louis Comfort Tiffany Fellowship
1958	Fulbright Fellowship

Teaching Experience
1975: Tamarind Institute, New Mexico (visiting artist)
1969-74: California State University, Sacramento
1969: University of California, Berkeley 
1967-69: School of Visual Arts, New York
1966: University of California, Davis

Collections 

Joseph Raffael’s paintings are in the collections of nearly 50 museums, private and public institutions, including the Allentown Art Museum; the Art Institute of Chicago; the Berkeley Art Museum; the Boca Raton Museum of Art; the Brauer Museum of Art; the Butler Institute of American Art; California College of Arts and Crafts; The Canton Museum of Art; the Cleveland Museum of Art; The Contemporary Museum; Crocker Art Museum; Delaware Art Museum; Denver Art Museum; Des Moines Art Center; Everson Museum of Art; Fort Worth Art Museum; Hirshhorn Museum and Sculpture Garden; Honolulu Museum of Art; MOCA Jacksonville; Joslyn Art Museum; Krannert Art Museum; Library of Congress; Long Beach Museum of Art; Los Angeles County Museum of Art; Metropolitan Museum of Art; Mint Museum; Museum of Contemporary Art, Chicago; Museum of Fine Arts (St. Petersburg, Florida); Museum of Outdoor Arts; the Oakland Museum of California; the Philadelphia Museum of Art; the Rahr West Art Museum; the San Francisco Museum of Modern Art; San Francisco Ballet; Santa Barbara Museum of Art; the Speed Art Museum;  the Smithsonian American Art Museum; the Toledo Museum of Art; Tulsa Performing Arts Center; University of Bridgeport; the University of Georgia; the University of Massachusetts Amherst; the University of New Mexico; Utah Museum of Fine Arts; the Virginia Museum of Fine Arts; the Walker Art Center; Washington County Museum of Fine Arts; the Weisman Art Museum; the Whitney Museum of American Art; as well as in numerous other important public and private collections.

Selected publications

Books 
Raffael, Joseph; Pagel, David; Erlanson, Amanda (ed.). Talking Beauty: A Conversation Between Joseph Raffael and David Pagel About Art, Love, Death, and Creativity (Zero+ Publishing, 2018); 

Goodman, Lanie; Dillard Stroud, Betsy; Pagel, David.  Moving Toward the Light: Joseph Raffael (ACC Editions, 2015); 

Wallach, Amei; Kuspit, Donald. Reflections of Nature, Paintings by Joseph Raffael (Abbeyville Press, 1998); 

Arthur, John.  Realists at Work: Studio Interviews and Working Methods of Ten Leading Contemporary Painters (Watson-Guptill Publications, 1983);

Articles 
Harp, Grady.  Book Review: 'Talking Beauty: A Conversation Between Joseph Raffael and David Pagel About Art, Love, Death, and Creativity' by Joseph Raffael. San Francisco Review of Books, Nov 2018.

Nancy Hoffman Gallery opens an exhibition of small square format watercolors by Joseph Raffael. artdaily.org, Oct 2017.

Robertson, Dean.  From the South of France to the West Side of Manhattan, With Love: Joseph Raffael’s Jewels. http://pdrobertson.com/, 22 Sept 2017.

Stroud, Betsy Dillard.  Joseph Raffael: Living in the Now.  The Artists Magazine, Sept 2017 (cover article).

Furman, Anna. Joseph Raffael’s Prismatic Watercolors Celebrate the Beauty of the Natural World. Artsy, 21 Sept 2015.

Stroud, Betsy Dillard.  Joseph Raffael: Moving Toward the Light. The Artists Magazine, May 2014. (cover article).

Joseph Raffael, Art at Eighty.  watercolor.net, 10 June 2013.

MacMillian, Kyle. In this case, being beautiful is enough. The Denver Post, 13 May 2009.

Strickley, Sarah A.  The Creative Instant.  The Artist's Magazine, May 2009. (cover article)

Joseph Raffael: Random Thoughts and Painting Diaries.  artistsnetwork, 16 March 2009.

Strickley, Sarah A.  The Story of the Artist . Watercolor Magic, June 2007.

Cotter, Holland.  Art in Review: Joseph Raffael.  The New York Times, 25 March 1994.

Henry, Gerrit.  Joseph Raffael at Nancy Hoffman.  Art in America, May 1991, pp. 174–75.

Hughes, Robert.  A Slice of the River.  Time, 15 October 1973, Vol. 102 Issue 16, p114.

References

External links
Official site
Nancy Hoffman Gallery
Joseph Raffael in the National Gallery of Australia's Kenneth Tyler Collection
Joseph Raffael in the Art Institute of Chicago
Joseph Raffael in the Los Angeles County Museum of Art
Joseph Raffael: How Life Affects the Paintings (video, 2020)

1933 births
2021 deaths
People from Brooklyn
20th-century American painters
American male painters
21st-century American painters
21st-century American male artists
20th-century American male artists